Wario World is a platform video game developed by Treasure and published by Nintendo for the GameCube. Part of the Wario series, it was released in Europe, North America and Australia in 2003 and Japan in 2004. The game's plot centers on Wario and his quest to regain his treasure and his castle from the evil gem, Black Jewel.

The game was fairly well received by reviewers, who praised the game's gameplay while criticizing its short length. The game has sold over 142,000 copies in Japan and over 256,000 copies in the United States. In 2004, the game was re-released as a Player's Choice title.

Gameplay

Wario Worlds gameplay centers mainly on combating enemies, although it requires some platform navigation similar to Super Mario 64 and Super Mario Sunshine. The controls are simple, and are only used to jump, run, dash, perform fighting moves, and use the "Hyper Suction" ability to collect nearby coins. The level designs are platform-based with combat elements, and have an overall linear design. The levels contain trapdoors, which lead to special platforming or puzzle-oriented challenges. Throughout the game, small forest sprites known as "Spritelings" give Wario advice if they are rescued from imprisonment.

During combat, Wario can grab enemies and either spin them around, throw them, or piledrive them into the ground. Enemies drop coins when defeated, and tend to regenerate if the area is left and returned to later. The coins are used to purchase items, such as life-restoring garlic, and to return to life. If Wario does not have enough money to return to life, the game is over. A new feature in Wario World are the spherical "glue globes", in which Wario is stuck to if he touches it, allowing the player to reach otherwise inaccessible areas. Along the way, Wario can re-collect his lost treasures, which are hidden in treasure chests, and collect pieces of golden Wario statues, which increases Wario's life meter by one half. In order to advance in the game, the player must collect a certain amount of red diamonds in each level. If the player collects all the treasure in the various levels, minigames from the Game Boy Advance title WarioWare, Inc.: Mega Microgames! are unlocked, and they can be played by using the GameCube – Game Boy Advance link cable.

Plot
The game begins with Wario enjoying his newly built castle, which is filled with treasures that he has collected from earlier adventures. An evil gem called Black Jewel, hidden amongst Wario's treasure collection, suddenly awakens and takes over the castle. Black Jewel turns Wario's treasure into monsters, and transforms the castle into four  worlds called Excitement Central, Spooktastic World, Thrillsville, and Sparkle Land, each consisting of two levels and a boss fight. A central area allows access to the different worlds, as well as to the Treasure Square, where the Huge Treasure Box inside of which Black Jewel is hiding can be found. Wario proceeds through the areas controlled by Black Jewel, recovering his treasure and rescuing Spritelings (the creatures that had sealed Black Jewel away in the past), then obtains the key to the Huge Treasure Box and engages Black Jewel in a battle. Wario's subsequent victory allows him to regain control of his castle.

During the game's ending, Wario's new castle quality depends on the number of Spritelings rescued. The worst-case scenario sees Wario with nothing but a campsite with his throne in a dark jungle, but if all 40 Spritelings were rescued, Wario is given a palace even grander than his previous one.

Development
Wario World was shown at E3 2002 as a technical demo. At the next E3 in 2003, it was shown with levels of gameplay polish and tweaking, which the previous E3 demo was lacking. On August 22, 2002, at Nintendo's Gamer's Summit, Wario Worlds North American release date was set to November 11, 2002. The game was later going to be released on May 26, 2003, but was further delayed by one month till June 23.

It was uncertain who was developing Wario World, until April 22, 2003, when Nintendo of America revealed that Treasure was developing the game. After the successful development collaboration Treasure and Nintendo shared with the Nintendo 64 title, Sin and Punishment, the two companies wanted to work together again. The R&D1 team wanted to continue their co-development juncture with a 3D installment of the Wario franchise. Wario Worlds music was composed by Norio Hanzawa and Minako Hamano. Wario was voiced by Charles Martinet, who also voices Mario and Luigi in the Mario series.

Reception

Wario World was a commercial success, selling over 142,000 copies in Japan. In 2004, the game was re-released alongside Mario Golf: Toadstool Tour and F-Zero GX as part of the Player's Choice line, a selection of games with high sales sold for a reduced price.

Wario World received fairly positive reviews. The US version of Play magazine gave the game a perfect score, and the reviewer commented that Wario World "pays off every second [he is] holding the controller, and that, to [him], is greatness". Nintendo Power said that the game was "tons of fun". GamePro stated that Wario World "stays addictive by weight of sheer design innovation". The American-based publication Game Informer praised the game for including "droves of awesome boss battles". Matt Casamassina of IGN declared that Wario World had "some great control mechanics and inventive level work". Electronic Gaming Monthlys Greg Ford said, "Wario [World] delivers a great time while it lasts and is well worth checking out. Just don't expect a Mario-quality adventure". Worthplaying gave the game 9 out 10, stating that "Treasure has done itself proud with this title, and Wario himself can lift his head up high. At least in my book, he's got at least one game that's better than Mario's."

Wario World received criticism for its length, with some reviewers stating that the game was shorter than the average console title. Tom Bramwell of Eurogamer compared Wario World to Luigi's Mansion, a game also criticized for its length, and said that the game was like Luigi's Mansion "all over again". GameSpy stated that Wario World "offers little above and beyond the standard 3D platform romp, and what is offered turns out to be very short and repetitive". GameSpot commented that "the final product is too short and simplistic to hold your attention for more than a day".

Notes

References

External links
 Official European website

2003 video games
3D platform games
Beat 'em ups
GameCube-only games
Treasure (company) games
Video games with 2.5D graphics
Video games developed in Japan
Video games set in castles
Wario video games
Wario Land
Video games about witchcraft
GameCube games
Single-player video games
Dinosaurs in video games
Games with GameCube-GBA connectivity